Jürgen Jürgens (5 October 1925 – 4 August 1994) was a German choral conductor and academic teacher. He founded and directed the Monteverdi-Chor Hamburg, a pioneering ensemble for Monteverdi's music.

Biography
Born in Frankfurt am Main, Jürgens received his musical training at the Musisches Gymnasium Frankfurt with Kurt Thomas. In 1955, he founded the award-winning Monteverdi-Chor Hamburg. They recorded for Archiv Produktion, focussing on works of Claudio Monteverdi. Later the choir became involved in the Telefunken/Teldec Bach cantatas project with the Leonhardt-Consort. From 1961 to 1993, Jürgens was University Music Director of the Choir and Orchestra at the University of Hamburg. and was appointed professor at the University of Hamburg in 1973.

He died in Hamburg and was buried at the Ohlsdorf Cemetery.

Awards
 1985 Biermann Ratjen Medal
 1991 Johannes Brahms Medal

Discography
 Heinrich Schütz: St. Luke Passion, Max van Egmond, Peter-Christoph Runge – Jürgen Jürgens, 1966. 
 Monteverdi: Lamento d'Arianna, Jürgen Jürgens, Monteverdi-Chor Hamburg, 1973. 
 Alessandro Scarlatti: Madrigale, Hamburg, 1975. 
 Schütz: Die italienischen Madrigale, 1976. 
 Anton Bruckner Music of the St. Florian Period, 1984 – CD: BSVD-0109, 2011 (Bruckner Archive Production).

References

Further reading

External links
 Monteverdi Chor
 Jürgen Jürgens (Conductor) Bach Cantatas Website

1925 births
1994 deaths
German male conductors (music)
Musicians from Frankfurt
20th-century German conductors (music)
20th-century German male musicians
Academic staff of the University of Hamburg